Lozé is a surname. Notable people with the surname include:

 Henri-Auguste Lozé (1850–1915), French politician

See also
 Loze (disambiguation)

French-language surnames